Amerinus linearis is a species of beetle in the family Carabidae, the only species in the genus Amerinus.

References

Harpalinae